William Villiers Brown (1843 – 29 April 1915) was an Australian politician. He was a member of the Queensland Legislative Assembly and the Queensland Legislative Council.

Public life 
Brown was the member for Townsville in the Legislative Assembly of Queensland from 1885 to 1888 and from 1891 to 1893.

He was appointed a member of the Queensland Legislative Council from 1901 to his death in 1915. He served as a minister without portfolio in Robert Philp's government from 1907 to 1908.

Later life 
Brown died on 29 April 1915 and was buried in Toowong Cemetery.

References

1843 births
1915 deaths
Members of the Queensland Legislative Assembly
Members of the Queensland Legislative Council
Place of birth missing
Burials at Toowong Cemetery